The Midwest Athletic Club is a historic athletic club building located at 6 N. Hamlin Ave. in the West Garfield Park community area of Chicago, Illinois. The club was built in 1926-28 under the direction of a committee of West Side business leaders. The thirteen-story building's design featured ornamental terra cotta, large arched windows on the third floor, and a mansard roof; it also provided views of Garfield Park, the north side of which was across the street. Its facilities included an Olympic-sized swimming pool, a gymnasium and exercise rooms, handball courts, billiard rooms, a library, dining rooms, and a ballroom. The club grew to include 2000 members in its first year, most of them businessmen and their families; however, the building entered receivership in 1930 and was converted into a hotel.

The building was listed on the National Register of Historic Places on October 18, 1984.

References

Buildings and structures on the National Register of Historic Places in Chicago
Buildings and structures completed in 1928
Clubhouses on the National Register of Historic Places in Illinois
Men's club buildings